Sam Gellard (born March 15, 1950 in Port of Spain, Trinidad and Tobago) is a retired Canadian ice hockey left winger. He played 28 games for the Philadelphia/Vancouver Blazers of the World Hockey Association (WHA). As a youth, he played in the 1962 Quebec International Pee-Wee Hockey Tournament with his team from Don Mills, Toronto.

Gellard's daughter Kim is a former World Curling champion.

References

External links

1950 births
Canadian ice hockey left wingers
Living people
Penn Quakers men's ice hockey players
Sportspeople from Port of Spain
Philadelphia Blazers players
Roanoke Valley Rebels (SHL) players
Trinidad and Tobago emigrants to Canada
Vancouver Blazers players